Lordswood Football Club is a football club based in the Lordswood suburb of Chatham, England.

History
The club was established in 1968. They joined the Rochester and District League and were promoted in successive seasons to the Premier Division. In 1982 the club moved up to Division Two of the Western Section of the Kent County League. A third-place finish in their first season in the division saw them promoted to Division One. In 1984–85 the club were Division One runners-up, earning promotion to the Premier Division of the Western Section.

Lordswood were Premier Division runners-up in 1986–87 and were promoted to the Senior Division. They were subsequently Senior Division runners-up in 1989–90. Although the club finished bottom of the Senior Division in 1991–92, league reorganisation and a merger of the Eastern and Western sections saw them placed in the Premier Division of the league the following season. They were Premier Division runners-up in 1994–95, before moving up to the Kent League in 1996.

In 2004–05 Lordswood finished bottom of the Kent League. This was repeated in 2009–10, but there was no relegation in either season. In 2013 the league was renamed the Southern Counties East League, and following the addition of a second division in 2016, the club became members of the league's Premier Division. They finished the 2021–22 season in the relegation zone, but were reprieved due to vacancies in divisions above.

Ground
The club play at Martyn Grove. The ground has hardstanding on three sides of the pitch and a 123-seat stand on the fourth. The record attendance of 600 was set for a friendly match against Gillingham in July 2003 to mark the opening of a new boardroom, with the visitors winning 5–0.

Records
Best FA Cup performance: First qualifying round, 2001–02, 2005–06
Best FA Vase performance: Fourth round, 2012–13
Record attendance: 600 vs Gillingham, friendly, July 2003

See also
Lordswood F.C. players
Lordswood F.C. managers

References

External links

 
Football clubs in England
Football clubs in Kent
Association football clubs established in 1968
1968 establishments in England
Sport in Medway
Chatham, Kent
Kent County League
Southern Counties East Football League